Timber Run is a tributary of Rocky Brook in Mercer County, New Jersey in the United States.

Course

Another nearby creek
Another tributary to Rocky Brook that runs nearby is also called Timber Run.  This one starts in the middle of a field between Lake Drive and the original alignment of Milford Rd.  It flows west-northwest to a point behind a restaurant located a few hundred feet east of the New Jersey Turnpike.  From there, the creek turns west-southwest, and continues until it drains into a narrow recessed section of Peddie Lake.  Much of this stream is culverted, and parts of its route are diverted around local businesses and Interchange 8 of the Turnpike.

See also
List of rivers of New Jersey

References

External links
USGS Coordinates in Google Maps

Rivers of Mercer County, New Jersey
Tributaries of the Raritan River
Rivers of New Jersey